Everlasting Country is the eleventh full-length solo studio album by American country rap artist Ryan Upchurch. It was released on April 20, 2020 via Redneck Nation Records. Produced by Thomas "Greenway" Toner a.k.a. T-Stoner, who also plays drums on the album, it features contributions from Tyler Branch on guitar, Marquez Brown on bass, Eddy Dunlap on steel, Justin Saunders on cello, with guest vocals by Carly Rogers. The album peaked at number 61 on the Billboard 200 and at number six on both the Top Country Albums and the Independent Albums charts in the United States.

Track listing

Personnel
Ryan Upchurch – vocals
Carly Rogers – vocals (track 9)
Thomas Toner – drums, producer, mixing
Tyler Branch – guitar
Marquez "Sage Tunz" Brown – bass
Eddy Dunlap – steel
Justin Saunders – cello
Brandon Mosley – engineering assistant

Charts

References

External links
Everlasting Country by Upchurch on Discogs
Everlasting Country by Upchurch on iTunes

2020 albums
Upchurch (musician) albums